Shirley Grasser Horton (July 17, 1952) is a Japanese–American politician who served as the 37th mayor of Chula Vista, California, and in the California State Assembly as a member of the Republican Party.

Horton was born in Japan and educated in California at Bonita Vista High School and San Diego State University. In the 1980s she served as the president of the South San Diego Bay Cities Board of Realtors before becoming active in local politics in Chula Vista when she was appointed to the city's planning commission. In 1991, she was selected to fill Tim Nader's seat and was later elected mayor in 1994. She served as mayor until she was term limited in 2002, and ran for a seat in the California State Assembly from the 78th district. She served in the assembly until she was term limited in 2008.

Early life

Shirley Grasser Horton was born in Japan while her father was serving in the United States Navy. She attended Robert E. Lee Elementary School and O'Farrell Junior High School before graduating from Bonita Vista High School. She later graduated from San Diego State University with a master's degree.

Career

Local politics

Horton was selected to serve as president of the South San Diego Bay Cities Board of Realtors to succeed Bill Gildner in 1986, and was later succeeded by Donald Hayes in 1988. She was appointed to serve as chairwoman of the Chula Vista Planning Commission in 1990.

Horton was appointed in 1991, out of twenty-seven applicants, by a unanimous vote to the Chula Vista city council to fill the vacancy created by Tim Nader's becoming mayor following the death of Mayor Gail McCandliss. She won reelection in 1992, after raising $20,746 during the campaign.

On February 14, 1994, Horton announced that she would seek the mayoral office of Chula Vista and placed first out of four candidates in the election after spending $67,422 during the campaign. She won reelection in 1998. Horton was unable to seek reelection in 2002, due to term limits.

California State Assembly

Horton announced in 2001, that she would seek election to the California State Assembly from the 78th district. She won the Republican nomination against Matt Mendoza and won in the general election against Democratic nominee Vince Hall.

During her tenure in the state assembly Horton attempted to join the Democratic Asian Pacific Islander Caucus along with two other Republican members of the state assembly.

Later life

In 2009, Horton considered running for a seat in the California State Senate from the 40th district. She ran for a seat on the California Board of Equalization in 2014.

Electoral history

References

External links
 Official Website
 Join California Shirley Horton

21st-century American politicians
21st-century American women politicians
American mayors of Japanese descent
American women of Japanese descent in politics
California politicians of Japanese descent
Living people
Mayors of Chula Vista, California
Republican Party members of the California State Assembly
Women state legislators in California
1952 births
Asian-American city council members
Women city councillors in California
Asian conservatism in the United States